Mark Gary Maas is an Australian politician. He has been a Labor Party member of the Victorian Legislative Assembly since November 2018, where he represents the seat of Narre Warren South. Maas was born and raised in the Melbourne south-eastern suburb of Springvale - the Australian-born son of Sri Lankan migrants.

For 16 years previously, he worked at the National Union of Workers(now United Workers Union). where for the last four years he was its Victorian Secretary. 

Maas has previously worked as a professional musician, educator and private-practice lawyer. He has been a board member on several commercial and not-for profit boards. He co-parents his two daughters from a previous marriage.

In November 2022 he was re-elected with an increased margin, in a third term Andrews Labor Government.

Maas currently resides in St Kilda, roughly 40km from his electorate, despite plans to relocate upon wining the seat in the City of Casey.

References

Year of birth missing (living people)
Living people
Australian Labor Party members of the Parliament of Victoria
Members of the Victorian Legislative Assembly
21st-century Australian politicians